Another One is the second mini-LP by Canadian singer-songwriter Mac DeMarco released on August 7, 2015 by Captured Tracks. The mini-LP was preceded by the release of four streaming singles on Spotify, "The Way You'd Love Her", "Another One", "I've Been Waiting for Her", and "No Other Heart". The title track was accompanied by a music video directed by DeMarco himself.

Background and production 

Another One was recorded by DeMarco in his home in Far Rockaway, Queens, New York between tour dates promoting his previous studio album Salad Days (2014). The songs were written within a week and recorded within the following week and a half.

Release and promotion 
The release of the mini-LP was announced on April 22, 2015. Along with the extended play, 43 tour dates, starting in April and ending in September, were announced. DeMarco is set to perform at several North American and European festivals and will also be headlining concerts on both continents. Dinner supported him on his first three dates, in Portland, Seattle and Vancouver. On May 11, DeMarco shared "The Way You'd Love Her", and announced 24 further tour dates, extending the festival and concert tour to November. Without permission, BBC Radio played the previously unheard song "Just to Put Me Down" from the mini-LP on June 9. A week later, DeMarco released a self-directed music video for the mini-LP's title track. He also encouraged fans to upload their own cover versions of the song and announced he would award 69 cents to the fan with the best submission. On July 8, DeMarco held a listening party and BBQ for fans in Brooklyn, New York. Attendees who offered donations to a food bank received BBQ food. DeMarco shared "I've Been Waiting for Her" on July 14. "No Other Heart" premiered on Annie Mac's BBC Radio 1 show Musical Hot Water Bottle on July 20. Another One was made available for streaming through NPR Music on July 31.

At the end of the final track, "My House by the Water," DeMarco recites his home address in New York City and invites fans for a cup of coffee. Two weeks after Another One had been leaked online, about 30 strangers had come to his house. Speaking about this in an interview, DeMarco said, "The way I rationalize it, to have the address you’ll have to listen to the album to the very end. Second, to even consider coming to my house, you have to be a kind of a superfan. And thirdly, it’s in such a weird part of New York that if they actually get there, they deserve a cup of coffee."

Critical reception 

At Metacritic, which assigns a weighted mean rating out of 100 to reviews from mainstream critics, the album received an average score of 75 based on 29 reviews, which indicates "generally favorable reviews".

Accolades

Commercial performance 
Another One debuted at number 25 on the Billboard 200 and number one on Top Rock Albums, making it DeMarco's highest-peaking release to date and first number-one release on the latter chart. It sold 13,000 copies in its first week, 6,000 of which were in the vinyl configuration. Its debut also represented DeMarco's best album sales week to date.

Track listing

Personnel
Album personnel as adapted from album liner notes.
 Mac DeMarco – all instruments, production, recording, mixing
 Josh Bonati – mastering
 Kiera McNally – cover art
 Yuki Kikuchi – cover art (Another (Instrumental) One)
 Stefan Marx – typography

Charts

Release history

References

External links
 

2015 albums
Captured Tracks albums
Mac DeMarco albums